Ede Urua is a village in Eket local government area of Akwa Ibom State in Nigeria.

The people of Ede Urua mostly engage in farming.

References 

Villages in Akwa Ibom